A pendant light, sometimes called a drop or suspender, is a lone light fixture that hangs from the ceiling usually suspended by a cord, chain, or metal rod. Pendant lights are often used in multiples, hung in a straight line over kitchen countertops and dinette sets or sometimes in bathrooms.  Pendants come in a huge variety of sizes and vary in materials from metal to glass or concrete and plastic.  Many modern pendants are energy-saving low voltage models and some use halogen or fluorescent bulbs. 

A billiard or island light is a longer pendant fixture, usually with long fluorescent or multiple incandescent bulbs, used over kitchen islands and billiard tables.  They are sometimes considered a type of chandelier.

It is a key component to understanding architectural lighting design and sometimes associated with interior design.

Sizing rules 
Since pendant lights are typically smaller and placed in sets, it is important to follow general lighting rules to avoid creating poor lighting. An odd number of pendants is preferable to an even amount. Pendants should be placed high enough to allow an unobstructed view while either sitting or standing. Pendants should be placed 28-38 inches above a counter top, or 72 inches above the floor.

Pendant Light Positioning 
A popular place to install pendant lights is over kitchen countertops. As a general rule of thumb, a pendant light should be positioned 75-80cm apart and 75-80cm above an island bench. This is a generally applied rule when symmetry is in place.

References 

Light fixtures